Superheroes is the fourth studio album by Racer X. It was released in Japan under the name "Adventure of Racer X-Men" and distributed by Universal Japan. This album was released on Paul Gilbert's 34th birthday.

Track listing

Personnel
Jeff Martin – vocals
Paul Gilbert – guitars
John Alderete – bass
Scott Travis – drums

Production
 William Hames – photography
 Bruce Bouillet – mixing
 Paul Gilbert – audio production, engineer

Trivia
 The song "Mad at the World" uses the same chord progression (but in a lower tuning) as "My Kinda Woman" by Mr. Big which was released on Lean into It.
 The song "Godzilla" is a cover of Blue Öyster Cult, and includes a brief interpolation of David Bowie's "Fame".
 The album was mixed by former Racer X guitar player Bruce Bouillet.
 The track "Evil Joe" contains samples from a prank call made by a friend of Gilbert's to Joe Aufricht of the black metal band Satanicon. The call in its entirety appears as a bonus track on Mushroomhead's 1999 album M3 under the title "Dark and Evil Joe".

References

External links
 Official Racer X website

Racer X (band) albums
2001 albums